Natasha Suri is an Indian Actress, Supermodel and Former Miss World India. In 2006, she won the Femina Miss World India title and placed in the Top 17 at the Miss World contest. She is also a popular TV Host.

Career
Suri debuted as an actor in 2016 with the superhit Malayalam film King Liar with south superstar Dileep. The popular Bollywood suspense thriller "Dangerous" starring Bipasha Basu, Karan Singh Grover and Natasha Suri released on 14th Aug 2020 on MX player OTT platform. Natasha received immense appreciation for her performance as 'Gauri' in "Dangerous" by audiences all across. Her Hindi film 'Virgin Bhanupriya' where she essays the role of Shonali, released digitally on Zee5 Premium in July 2020. Suri played the mystery woman in the acclaimed webseries 'Inside Edge' on Amazon Prime in 2018. Natasha has also featured in Indian Popstar Mika Singh's music video 'Tum Jo Mil Gaye Ho' and in Jazzy B and Apache Indian's sassy music video 'Dil Mangdi'. 

Before winning Miss India, she had won several other beauty contests like the Navy Queen, Miss Maharashtra, and Get Gorgeous-1 on Channel V's National Supermodel hunt. Suri is a popular TV host too, having hosted more than a dozen shows. She first hosted the TV show Cell Guru on NDTV India and a luxury and lifestyle show Velvet. She then co-hosted the show 'Big Switch' season-3 with film director Rohit Shetty. She hosted another popular youth reality show 'SuperDude' and 'Live Out Loud' on UTV Bindass. She hosted the very stylish fashion based show 'Style Police' on UTV Bindass.

Suri has modelled for topline designer campaigns for Tarun Tahiliani, Rohit Bal, Suneet Varma, Ritu Kumar, Hemant Trevedi, Neeta Lulla and many more.

Suri debuted as a fashion model at Rome Fashion Week, subsequently modelling at Dubai Fashion Week, Amazon India Fashion Weeks and Lakme Fashion Weeks for more than five seasons. She has walked the runway for practically all top notch Indian designers in over 1000 ramp shows. She has walked the ramp as a showstopper for several designers.

As a photographic model Natasha has featured on several magazine covers like Femina, Elle, Top Gear, Maxim, Avante Garde Life, Lifestyle & Luxury, Time & Style, Fitness First, Time Out, Fashion You Intimate, Brides Now, Models & Trends, Smart Photography and more.

Suri was listed in Maxim's list of 100 Hottest Women in 2016. She was appointed Tourism Ambassador of Mauritius in 2007, receiving the 'Friends of Mauritius' accolade from the country's Deputy Prime Minister. In 2006 the President of Sri Lanka felicitated her for her role as an Indian ambassador during her tenure as Miss India. In 2012, she was invited as the guest of honour and felicitated at the Seychelles India National parade by the Seychelles government. In 2008, she was conferred upon the 'Pillar of Hindustan' award for her achievements in the fashion & beauty industry.

Beauty pageants won
 2005: Navy Queen: winner
 2005: Miss Maharashtra: winner
 2004: Get Gorgeous-1: winner
 2006: Miss India World winner; Miss Beautiful Smile; Miss Personality
 2006: Miss World: Semifinalist, Miss Best Body(3rd), Best Designer Gown, Miss Talent (top 5)

Filmography

References

External links

 
 Miss India - Profile

Living people
Female models from Mumbai
Femina Miss India winners
Miss World 2006 delegates
1989 births